The Peel Manxcar was a prototype 2+2 seater saloon car designed by Cyril Cannell and Henry Kissack and manufactured in 1955 by the Manx Peel Engineering Company.  The projected purchase price of the assembled Manxcar was "....ten shillings short of £300, including purchase tax."  Initially renamed from "Peel Manxman" because of the Excelsior (Coventry) motorbike of the same name, the Manxcar never entered standard production.

References

External links
Peel Engineering Company
page for Manxcar at peelcars.com

Microcars
Three-wheeled motor vehicles
Peel Engineering Company
Sedans